Agata Witkowska (née Durajczyk; born 19 August 1989) is a Polish volleyball player, playing as a libero. She is part of the Poland women's national volleyball team.

She competed at the 2015 European Games, and 2015 Women's European Volleyball Championship. 
On club level she plays for Atom Trefl Sopot.

References

External links

1989 births
Living people
Polish women's volleyball players
Place of birth missing (living people)
Sportspeople from Gdańsk
Volleyball players at the 2015 European Games
European Games silver medalists for Poland
European Games medalists in volleyball
21st-century Polish women